A by-election was held for the New South Wales Legislative Assembly electorate of East Macquarie on 10 May 1860 because of the resignation of Thomas Hawkins.

Dates

Result

Thomas Hawkins resigned.

See also
Electoral results for the district of East Macquarie
List of New South Wales state by-elections

References

1860 elections in Australia
New South Wales state by-elections
1860s in New South Wales